Tadashi Yanada (梁田貞; 1883–1959) was a Japanese composer. His music was performed at Seijo Elementary School.

Works, editions and recordings
 The Rain of Jogashima ("Jo-ga-shima no ame 城ヶ島の雨"), 1913, for flute and harp.
 A Rolling Acorn (Donguri korokoro), a translation of a nursery rhyme.

References

1883 births
1959 deaths
20th-century Japanese composers
20th-century Japanese male musicians
Japanese male composers
Musicians from Sapporo